The Central District of Amol County is a district (bakhsh) in Amol County, Mazandaran Province, Iran. At the 2006 census, its population was 260,971, in 71,432 families.  The District has one city: Amol.  The District has two rural districts (dehestan): Bala Khiyaban-e Litkuh Rural District, Chelav Rural District, Harazpey-ye Jonubi Rural District, and Pain Khiyaban-e Litkuh Rural District.

References 

Amol County
Districts of Mazandaran Province